FC Kristall Dyatkovo was a Russian football team from Dyatkovo. It played professionally from 1994 to 1996. Their best result was 9th place in Zone 4 of the Russian Third League in 1995.

External links
  Team history at KLISF

Association football clubs established in 1992
Association football clubs disestablished in 1997
Defunct football clubs in Russia
Sport in Bryansk Oblast
1992 establishments in Russia
1997 disestablishments in Russia